Manouchehr Sotoudeh (19 July 1913 – 8 April 2016) was an Iranian geographer and scholar of Persian literature. He wrote 60 books and nearly 300 articles. He is the first Iranian who published the first dialectal dictionary. He was also a professor of University of Tehran.

See also 
 Persian literature
 Badiozzaman Forouzanfar
 Five-Masters

References

External links
 Manouchehr Sotoudeh's death - The Iran Project
 Manouchehr Sotoudeh's documentary film
 Manouchehr Sotoudeh at The Center for Iranian and Islamic Studies
 Manouchehr Sotoudeh-Iranian Book News Agency (IBNA)

1913 births
2016 deaths
Iranian writers
Iranian literary scholars
Iranian geographers
Iranian centenarians
Iranian lexicographers
Men centenarians
Academic staff of the University of Tehran
People from Mazandaran Province
Members of the Academy of Persian Language and Literature
People from Nur, Iran
Iranian Science and Culture Hall of Fame recipients in Geography
Iran's Book of the Year Awards recipients
Faculty of Letters and Humanities of the University of Tehran alumni